Sainte-Croix is a suburb of the capital city, Port Louis, in Mauritius, an independent island in the Indian Ocean.

References

Port Louis
Port Louis District
Populated places in Mauritius
Catholic pilgrimage sites
Religion in Port Louis